22-20s is the debut self-titled album by the English rock band 22-20s, released 20 September 2004.

Track listing
All songs written by Martin Trimble, except where noted.
"Devil in Me"  4:16
"Such a Fool" 3:56
"Baby Brings Bad News" (Charly Coombes) 3:48
"22 Days" 2:58
"Friends" 4:00
"Why Don't You Do It for Me?" 3:38
"Shoot Your Gun" 4:46
"The Things That Lovers Do" 4:05
"I'm the One" 2:57
"Hold On" 5:18

Bonus track
"Baby, You're Not in Love" 3:27 (Japan and U.S. versions only)

Personnel
Martin Trimble: Guitars, Vocals
Charly Coombes: Keyboards, Vocals
Glen Bartup: Bass
James Irving: Drums, Percussion

Release
The album has been released in various countries.

References

22-20s albums
2004 debut albums
Astralwerks albums
Heavenly Recordings albums